Haon may refer to:

People
 Haon (rapper), South Korean rapper

Places
 HaOn, Israel
 Saint-Haon, France
 Saint-Haon-le-Châtel, France
 Saint-Haon-le-Vieux, France